Felix Arroyo may refer to:

 Felix D. Arroyo (born 1948), city councilor in Boston, Massachusetts, 2003–2008
 Felix G. Arroyo (born 1979), his son, city councilor in Boston, Massachusetts, 2010–2014